North West Warriors was formed in 2013 and became a Twenty20 team in 2017. They played their inaugural Twenty20 in the 2017 Inter-Provincial Trophy against Northern Knights. In total, 29 players have appeared in Twenty20 cricket for North West Warriors, with three players (Andy McBrine, David Rankin, and Stuart Thompson) having played in all fifteen Twenty20 fixtures played by North West Warriors.

William Porterfield is North West Warriors leading run-scorer in Twenty20 cricket, aggregating 269 runs. Aaron Gillespie has the highest score in the format for North West Warriors, with 80 not out scored in 2018 against Munster Reds. For players who have made five or more appearances, Porterfield has the teams best batting average: 29.88. Among the bowlers, Craig Young and has taken more wickets than any other with 24. Young also has the best bowling figures in an innings: he claimed five wickets against Northern Knights in a 2017 match, while conceding 15 runs.

Players are initially listed in order of appearance; where players made their debut in the same match, they are initially listed by batting order.

Key

List of Twenty20 cricketers

See also
List of North West Warriors first-class players
List of North West Warriors List A players

References

North West Warriors
Cricketers, Twenty20